While still members of David Cameron's Coalition government, the Liberal Democrat leader and Deputy Prime Minister, Nick Clegg, announced a new frontbench team on 7 January 2015, in advance of that year's general election.

Membership

References

Liberal Democrats (UK)
Liberal Democrats (UK) frontbench team